The Falls River is a  river located in Essex, Connecticut. It begins in the Pond Meadow area of Ivoryton and runs for about  through Essex. Its beginnings are visible from Comstock Field at the end of Park Road in Ivoryton. Before that it runs to a small pond behind the L.C. Doane Company near Pond Meadow Road. It runs along the old Sohmer Piano Factory, under Walnut Street, and along Main Street. It continues to run along Main Street, being very visible near the Lutheran Church. It eventually winds its way to the Connecticut River, near a parcel of conserved land called Osage Trails.

See also
List of rivers of Connecticut

References 

. USGS. Retrieved on 2008-02-03.

Essex, Connecticut
Rivers of Middlesex County, Connecticut
Tributaries of the Connecticut River
Rivers of Connecticut